Angel's Revenge is a 2014 South Korean daily drama starring Yoon So-yi, Park Jung-chul, Moon Bo-ryung and Kwon Yul . It aired on KBS2 from January 6 to June 2, 2014 for 103 episodes.

Plot
Lee Seon-yoo is training to become a nun. Right before she finally gets her wish, she learns that her beloved older sister Jin-yoo has died. Jin-yoo was betrayed and killed by her lover, Jang Tae-jung. Tae-jung, a smart, good-looking man from a humble background, had committed himself to luring and marrying a tycoon's daughter "against all odds," as part of an effort to get him into the upper class of society.

Seon-yoo then meets Seo Ji-seok, an immature man from a rich family whose sister Ji-hee is married to Tae-jung. Ji-seok is at risk of losing the inherited family business to Tae-jung and Ji-hee, since Ji-seok's mother is the family patriarch's second wife.

To take revenge on the man responsible for her sister's death, Seon-yoo gives up her dream of becoming a nun. She marries Ji-seok, and becomes Tae-jung's sister-in-law. Thus, Seon-yoo begins leading a double life: she pretends to be the ideal wife and daughter-in-law in front of the Seo family, and only takes off her mask in front of Tae-jung, proving she can be just as ruthless and vicious as Tae-jung. Seon-yoo wears her angel wings while hiding the dagger of revenge.

Cast

Main
Yoon So-yi as Lee Seon-yoo
Park Jung-chul as Jang Tae-jung
Kwon Yul  as Seo Ji-seok
Moon Bo-ryung as Seo Ji-hee

Supporting
Lee Se-eun as Lee Jin-yoo
Lee Dal-hyung as Heo Poong-ho
Choi Wan-jung as Bong Hwang
Lee Hye-eun as Bong Chang
Choi Chung Woo as Hwang Jung-in
Kim Min-soo as Heo Ki-jin
Lee Eung-kyung as Na Dal-nyeo
Jang In-sub as In-seob	
Jung Yi-yeon as Jang Tae-mi
Jung Young-sook as Gong Jung-soon
Kim Chung as Woo Ah-ran
Choi Jae-won as Seo Woo-hyun
Choi Dong-yub as Section Chief Kim
Go Bo-gyeol as Jung-in
Kim Hae-rim as Ahn-na
Goo Jae-yee as Park Chae-rin
Yoon Seo-jin as Jung Hee-joo

References

External links
  
 
 
 
 Angel's Revenge at Free Will Company

Korean Broadcasting System television dramas
2014 South Korean television series debuts
Korean-language television shows
Television series about revenge
2014 South Korean television series endings
South Korean romance television series
South Korean melodrama television series